Daali is an upcoming Indian Kannada-language Gangster action drama film written and directed by Prabhu Srinivas and starring Dhananjay and Rachita Ram. The score and soundtrack of the film is composed by Anoop Seelin.

Cast 
 Dhananjay as Daali
 Rachita Ram
 Baburaj

Production 
The film was announced in February 2019 by producer Yogesh Narayan under his banner Yogesh Motion Pictures with director Prabhu Srinivas.

References

External links 

Upcoming films
Indian crime action films
Indian gangster films
Indian action drama films
Indian crime drama films
Upcoming Kannada-language films
Films scored by Anoop Seelin
Films directed by Prabhu Srinivas